Calpain-10 is a protein that in humans is encoded by the CAPN10 gene.

Calpains are ubiquitous, well-conserved family of calcium-dependent, cysteine proteases. The typical calpain proteins are heterodimers consisting of an invariant small subunit and variable large subunits. The large catalytic subunit has four domains: domain I, the N-terminal regulatory domain that is processed upon calpain activation; domain II, the protease domain; domain III, a linker domain of unknown function; and domain IV, the calmodulin-like calcium-binding domain.  The heterodimer interface is predominantly found between domain IV and the small subunit, which is also a calmodulin-like calcium-binding domain. This gene encodes a large subunit. It is an atypical calpain in that it lacks the calmodulin-like calcium-binding domain and instead has a divergent C-terminal domain.  It therefore cannot heterodimerize with the small subunit. It is similar in organization to calpains 5 and 6. This gene is associated with type 2 or non-insulin-dependent diabetes mellitus (NIDDM) and located within the NIDDM1 region. Multiple alternative transcript variants encoding different isoforms have been described for this gene.

References

Further reading

External links
 The MEROPS online database for peptidases and their inhibitors: C02.018